Hypsopygia marthalis is a species of snout moth in the genus Hypsopygia. It is found in western Malaysia, Sumatra, Borneo and Sri Lanka.

References

Moths described in 1859
Pyralini